Norbert Elgert (born 13 January 1957) is a German football manager and former player. He is the manager of the U19 team of Schalke 04 since 1996 (with a short interruption).

Elgert won the German U19 championship with the team in 2006, 2012 and 2015.

He coached the later German world champions Mesut Özil, Manuel Neuer, Benedikt Höwedes and Julian Draxler as well as Leroy Sané, Joël Matip and Sead Kolašinac.

In 2013, he was named the German coach of the year  by the German Football Association.

He is a member of the Schalke Hall of Fame ("Ehrenkabine").

References

External links 
 

1957 births
Living people
German football managers
German footballers
Association football forwards
Bundesliga players
2. Bundesliga players
FC Schalke 04 players
SC Westfalia Herne players
VfL Osnabrück players
SG Wattenscheid 09 players
Sportspeople from Gelsenkirchen
Footballers from North Rhine-Westphalia